Weinersmith is a surname. Notable people with the surname include:

 Kelly Weinersmith, American biologist
 Zach Weinersmith (born 1982), American cartoonist and writer